Aster tataricus, also called Tatarinow's aster, is a member of the Aster genus of flowering plants.

Uses

Culinary
Known as gaemichwi in Korean, the plant is considered a chwinamul (edible Aster) variety used in Korean cuisine.

Medicinal
It is one of the 50 fundamental herbs of Traditional Chinese medicine, where it has the name zǐwǎn.  It has an antibacterial action, inhibiting the growth of Staphylococcus aureus, E. coli, Bacillus dysenteriae, B. typhi, Pseudomonas and Vibrio proteus.

In culture
The flower has a meaning in hanakotoba, the Japanese language of flowers, which corresponds to "I won't forget you."

References

External links

Plants for a future Database

tataricus
Plants used in traditional Chinese medicine
Taxa named by Carl Linnaeus the Younger
Plants described in 1782
Flora of Korea